Alice Archenhold (née Markus; 27 August 1874 – 9 February 1943) was a German astronomer whose husband was fellow astronomer Friedrich Simon Archenhold.

Alice Markus was born in Wiesbaden, Germany, and married Friedrich Simon Archenhold in July 1897 and lived in Berlin. They went on to have five children together. Her sons, Günter, who became an astronomer, and Horst, both fled to England, but Alice was arrested and deported (along with her daughter Hilde) to Theresienstadt concentration camp, in Czechoslovakia, where she died on 9 February 1943. 

She is commemorated on her husband's grave at the Zentralfriedhof Friedrichsfelde, Berlin.

In 2010 a street in Treptow-Köpenick was renamed after her as Alice Archenhold Weg.

References 

1874 births
Place of birth missing
1943 deaths
20th-century German astronomers
Women astronomers
German people who died in the Theresienstadt Ghetto
Women in Nazi Germany
Jewish scientists
Jewish women scientists